Rainier of Monaco may refer to:

 Rainier I of Monaco, Lord of Cagnes (1267–1314)
 Rainier II, Lord of Monaco (1350–1407)
 Rainier III, Prince of Monaco (1928–2005)